SMU Dedman School of Law, commonly referred to as SMU Law School or Dedman School of Law is a law school located in Dallas, Texas. It was founded in February 1925. SMU Law School is located on the campus of its parent institution, Southern Methodist University.

SMU’s Law School was renamed SMU Dedman School of Law in February 2001 in honor of its benefactors, Robert H. Dedman Sr. and his wife, Nancy Dedman. SMU Law School was the only law school in Dallas until UNT opened its law school in 2014, and it is one of ten law schools in Texas. The current dean of the law school is Jason P. Nance.

Academic profile
SMU Dedman School of Law offers Juris Doctor, Master of Laws, and Doctor of Juridical Science degrees. The school offers two joint degree programs, a J.D./M.A. in Economics and a J.D./M.B.A. The J.D./M.A. in Economics is offered in connection with the SMU Department of Economics in Dedman College and the J.D./M.B.A. is offered in connection with the Cox School of Business.The class that enrolled in the fall of 2019 has a median LSAT score of 161 and a median undergraduate GPA of 3.7. LSAT/UGPA medians were calculated by the Law School Admission Council based on matriculant lists provided by the law school to the American Bar Association.

Each JD student must complete 87 credit hours. Thirty-one of these hours comprise the mandatory first-year curriculum. After the first year, students must complete a course in professional responsibility, two upper-level writing courses (including an edited writing seminar in which an extensive scholarly, expository writing project is reviewed and critiqued by the professor), Constitutional Law II, and a practical skills course. All students are required to perform 30 hours of public service before graduating.

Programs and resources
Dedman Law is home to four independent law journals: The SMU Law Review, Journal of Air Law and Commerce, The International Lawyer, and the SMU Science & Technology Law Review.

Dedman Law offers several law clinics for upper-division students. The law clinics include: the W.W. Caruth, Jr. Child Advocacy Clinic, Civil Clinic, Criminal Justice Clinic, Family Immigration Detention Clinic, Federal Taxpayers Clinic, First Amendment Clinic, Consumer Advocacy Project, Small Business Clinic & Trademark Clinic, Judge Elmo B. Hunter Legal Center for Victims of Crimes Against Women, Innocence Clinic, Patent Law Clinic, and Vansickle Family Law Clinic.

Dedman Law offers a summer program at the University of Oxford in Oxford, England, numerous international programs, and Underwood Law Library.

Underwood Law Library
SMU’s Underwood Law Library is the largest private academic law library west of the Mississippi River . Its collections include approximately 662,465 law-related volumes and equivalents, ranking the library among the top 20% of all law libraries in the United States.

Rankings
In 2020, SMU Dedman School of Law was ranked No. 56 in the nation by U.S. News & World Report, but was ranked No. 58 in the 2023 rankings.

Employment

According to SMU's official 2018 ABA-required disclosures, 80% of the Class of 2018 obtained full-time, long-term, JD-required employment nine months after graduation. SMU's Law School Transparency under-employment score is 10.8%, indicating the percentage of the Class of 2018 unemployed, pursuing an additional degree, or working in a non-professional, short-term, or part-time job nine months after graduation.

Costs
The total cost of attendance (indicating the cost of tuition, fees, and living expenses) at SMU for the 2020-2021 academic year is $83,464. The average amount borrowed for law school by members of the 2014 graduating class was $124,617.38.

Notable faculty
 Bryan Garner
Paul Hardin III (deceased)
A. Kenneth Pye (deceased)
Dale Carpenter

Notable alumni

 Keith Bergelt, former U.S. Diplomat and CEO of Open Invention Network
 Michael Boone, founder of Haynes and Boone, LLP
 Jane J. Boyle is a district judge for the United States District Court for the Northern District of Texas
 Angela Braly, former President and Chief Executive Officer for WellPoint (now Anthem)
 Raleigh Brown, member of the Texas House of Representatives; Texas State District Court judge in Abilene
 Jeff Cox (Legal Law Masters in Taxation), judge since 2005 of the Louisiana 26th Judicial District Court of Bossier and Webster parishes
 Catherine Crier, Dallas County District Judge, investigative journalist 
 Robert H. Dedman Jr., former CEO of ClubCorp
 Robert H. Dedman Sr., founder of private club network ClubCorp, Inc. and the law school’s co-benefactor
 Craig T. Enoch, former associate justice of the Texas Supreme Court
 Gerald J. Ford, noted Texas banker and businessman
 David C. Godbey, federal judge
 Rusty Hardin, an American attorney and head of the Houston law firm Rusty Hardin & Associates, P.C
 O. H. "Ike" Harris, Texas State Senator
 Nathan Hecht, Chief Justice of the Texas Supreme Court
 Todd Ames Hunter, Texas State Representative
 Ray Hutchison (B.A. '57, J.D. '59), former Texas state representative 
 Jerry Jones Jr., Chief Sales and Marketing Officer and Executive Vice President of the Dallas Cowboys
 S. M. Krishna, Minister of External Affairs of India and Former Chief Minister of Karnataka
 Stephen N. Limbaugh Jr., Justice, Supreme Court of Missouri
 Barbara M. Lynn, Judge, United States District Court for the Northern District of Texas
 Robert B. Maloney, federal judge
 Bagir Manan, Chief Justice of the Supreme Court of Indonesia
 Robert Mosbacher Jr., an American businessman, founder of BizCorps
 Harriet Miers, White House Deputy Chief of Staff, White House Counsel for George W. Bush
 John Ratcliffe, American politician who is the 6th Director of National Intelligence and served as the Congressman for Texas's 4th congressional district from 2015 to 2020.
 Trevor Rees-Jones, founder and chairman of Chief Oil & Gas
 Robert Rowling, founder of TRT Holdings, the holding company of Omni Hotels & Resorts and Gold's Gym
 Edward B. Rust Jr., chairman and chief executive officer of State Farm Mutual Automobile Insurance Company
 Rick Scott, American businessman, politician and junior United States senator from Florida. He served as 45th Governor of Florida from 2011 to 2019.
 Kenneth Sheets (J.D. 2004), Dallas attorney and Republican member of the Texas House of Representatives from District 107 in Dallas County since 2011
 Lamar Smith, the former U.S. Representative for Texas's 21st congressional district
 Helmut Sohmen, chairman of BW Group and a former Hong Kong legislator
 William Steger, Judge, United States District Court for the Eastern District of Texas

 Tsai Hong-tu, a Taiwanese businessman and banker
 Lamar White, investigative journalist known for his work on racism and political corruption in the Deep South
 James A. Baker, Justice of the Texas Supreme Court
 David Godbey, federal judge
 Nathan Hecht ,Texas Supreme Court Chief Justice
 Yukio Horigome, Justice, Supreme Court of Japan
 James Latane Noel Jr., Attorney General of Texas
 Gillian Triggs, President of the Australian Human Rights Commission
 Bagir Manan, Chief Justice of the Supreme Court of Indonesia
 Paul Hart, General Counsel for Mark Cuban

References

Law, Dedman School of
Law schools in Texas
Educational institutions established in 1925
1925 establishments in Texas